Pedana Kalamkari  also known as Machilipatnam style of Kalamkari work which involves vegetable dyed block-painting of a fabric. it is produced at  Pedana a nearby town of Machilipatnam in Krishna district of the Indian state of Andhra Pradesh. It was registered as one of the geographical indication from Andhra Pradesh under handicraft goods by Geographical Indications of Goods (Registration and Protection) Act, 1999.

History 
This style of art evolved during the rule of Mughal Dynasty and practiced by Golconda Sultanate. Different textile products produced from this style of work include, wall hangings and clothing like, bedsheets, curtains, saris etc. A wall hanger dating back to 15th Century AD, is still being displayed in Victoria Museum, London.

Kalamkari work 
The  Machilipatnam style of Kalamkari is one of the two styles of Kalamkari works present in India, with the other being, Srikalahasti style. It mainly uses vegetable dyes which are applied onto the fabric with the help of wooden blocks. According to GIR’s authorised user no – AU/396/GI/19/12, production of Machilipatnam Kalamkari is geographically only limited to Pedana town and its neighbouring villages of Machilipatnam, Polavaram and Kappaladoddi in Guduru mandal of Krishna district.

References 

Culture of Andhra Pradesh
Textile arts of India
Geographical indications in Andhra Pradesh
Machilipatnam